Queen Elizabeth Grammar School (QEGS) is an independent, public school (day school, no boarding) for boys in Wakefield, West Yorkshire, England. The school was founded by Royal Charter of Queen Elizabeth I in 1591 at the request of leading citizens in Wakefield (headed by Thomas Savile and his two sons) 75 in total and some of whom formed the first governing body.

The school is part of a foundation, with both QEGS Senior and Junior schools joined together, along with the nearby Wakefield Girls' High School and its Junior School, and Mulberry House, which is a nursery and pre-prep department.

As of September 2021, the headmaster of the school is Dr Richard Brookes, who was previously senior deputy head at City of London School.

QEGS is a member of the Headmasters' and Headmistresses' Conference.

Some notable former pupils include:
John Radcliffe, 17th century English physician,
Joseph Moxon, mathematician and hydrographer to King Charles II,
Richard Henry Lee, signer of the United States Declaration of Independence, US Senator and President of the Continental Congress,
Sir Francis Molyneux, 7th Baronet, Gentleman Usher of the Black Rod,
Mike Harrison, former captain England national rugby union team,
Mike Tindall, England Rugby Union player, member of the World Cup winning team in 2003, 
John Potter, Archbishop of Canterbury, 
The Rt Revd and Rt Hon the Lord Hope of Thornes, former Archbishop of York.

History

Founding

Queen Elizabeth Grammar School dates back to 19 November 1591 when a charter was granted to fourteen men to act as governors of the new school.

The charter read: 

Five of the fourteen men designated to be governors bore the name Saville. Generations of the Saville family have played important roles in the school's history and hence the reason why the Old Boys' Association is called the Old Savilians' Club.

Coat of arms

The school arms came into existence soon after the school was founded and features a lion, an owl and a Bible. The golden lion on a red field refers to the royal foundation; the silver owl on black is taken from the arms of the Savile family (one of the founding families) and the Bible indicates the religious side of education. The school motto, "Turpe Nescire", means "It is a disgrace to be ignorant".

School song

Around 1900, H. G. Abel, then the senior classics master, composed "Floreas, Wakefieldia" and Matthew Peacock, headmaster and honorary choirmaster at the cathedral, set the words to music. It was seen as fitting that the song should be written in Latin, thereby evoking echoes of traditional scholasticism. The song is still sung today – at Founders' Day, Speech Day and at all Old Savilian Club dinners.

Facilities

In 1854 QEGS moved to its present site in Northgate, Wakefield, into premises designed by the architect Richard Lane and formerly occupied by the West Riding Proprietary School. The attached Junior school for boys aged 7 to 11 was founded in 1910.

A new building (Savile Building) was opened in 2005 by Ted Wragg, the famous educationalist, who taught at the school in the early 1960s. The new building provides a new 6th form centre, English department, state-of-the-art theatre and Learning Resources Centre for the pupils of QEGS.

Sport

The school is often noted for its sporting ability, having achieved frequent success in a number of sports. Over 83% of the school's boys represent QEGS in one sporting event or another. The most popular sport is rugby union, followed by hockey, cricket, athletics, and basketball. Hockey in particular has experienced substantial growth in the school throughout the last decade, and is now close to matching rugby union's dominance internally. In 2006, 2013, 2014 and 2015 the under-15s Rugby side reached the Daily Mail Cup final, winning the 2015 competition in a tight 15-6 win over three time final rivals Warwick. In 2009 every age group won the hockey 'Yorkshire Cup' for the first time in the school's history with the under 16s going on to reach the national semi-finals, only to lose to Whitgift School. As well as plenty of sporting opportunities, the school also gives pupils the opportunity to participate in the Duke of Edinburgh's Award Scheme.

In popular culture

David Storey's Booker Prize winning novel Saville (1976) includes an account of the experiences of a working class boy at a Yorkshire grammar school in the 1940s. Storey, like the protagonist of Saville a miner's son, is an old boy of QEGS. 
The school is mentioned in the novel Nineteen Seventy-Four by David Peace.

Headmasters
Headmasters of Queen Elizabeth Grammar School, Wakefield from 1591 to the present time.

 1591-1598 Rev Edward Mawde MA, St John's College, Cambridge
 1600-1607 Rev John Beaumont MA
 1607-1607 Rev Jeremy Gibson MA
 1607-1607 Rev Robert Saunders MA, Fellow of King's College, Cambridge
 1607–1623 Rev Philip Isack MA, Emmanuel College, Cambridge
 1623-1663 Rev Robert Doughty MA
 1663-1665 Rev Samuel Garvey MA, Emmanuel College, Cambridge
 1665-1672 Rev Jeremiah Boulton MA, Magdalene College, Cambridge
 1672-1681 Rev John Baskervile BD, Emmanuel College, Cambridge
 1681-1693 Rev Edward Clarke MA, University College, Oxford
 1693-1703 Rev Edmund Farrer MA, St John's College, Cambridge
 1703-1720 Rev Thomas Clark MA, Jesus College, Cambridge
 1720-1751 Rev Benjamin Wilson MA, Trinity College, Cambridge
 1751-1758 Rev John Clarke MA, Fellow of Trinity College, Cambridge
 1758-1795 Rev Christopher Atkinson MA, The Queen's College, Oxford
 1795-1814 Rev Thomas Rogers MA, Magdalene College, Cambridge
 1814-1837 Rev Martin Joseph Naylor DD, Fellow of Queens' College, Cambridge
 1837-1847 Rev John Carter DD, St John's College, Cambridge
 1847-1875 Rev James Taylor DD, Trinity College, Cambridge
 1875-1883 Robert Leighton Leighton MA, Balliol College, Oxford
 1883-1910 Matthew Henry Peacock MA BMus, Exeter College, Oxford
 1911-1916 Joseph E. Barton MA, Pembroke College, Oxford
 1917-1939 Alfred J. Spilsbury MA, The Queen's College, Oxford
 1939-1956 Wilfred A. Grace MA, The Queen's College, Oxford
 1956-1964 Ernest J. Baggaley BSc
 1964-1975 J. K. Dudley MA, The Queen's College, Oxford
 1975-1985 James G. Parker MA, Christ's College, Cambridge
 1985-2001 Robert Mardling MA, St Edmund Hall, Oxford
 2001-2010 Michael Gibbons BA AKC, King's College London
 2010-2020 David Craig MA MEd
 2021-present Richard Brookes MChem DPhil, Worcester College, Oxford

Notable Old Savilians

Academia
 T.D. Barnes, Professor of Classics in the University of Toronto 1976–2007
 John Barron, classicist and Master of St Peter's College, Oxford
 Stuart Jones, British historian, Professor of Intellectual History at the University of Manchester
 Professor Sir Hans Leo Kornberg, British biochemist and master of Christ's College, Cambridge (1982–1995)
 David May, Professor of Computer Science at the University of Bristol, former lead architect of the transputer and Chief Technology Officer and founder of XMOS.
 Joseph Moxon, Mathematician and Hydrographer to King Charles II.
 Benjamin Pulleyne (died 1861), mathematician, Fellow of Clare College, Cambridge, and headmaster of Gresham's School
 Charles Ross (historian) (1924-1986), Professor of Medieval History, Bristol University, and author
 Alan M. Taylor, Professor of Economics and Finance, University of California, Davis
 John Wolfenden, Baron Wolfenden, Vice Chancellor of the University of Reading, and chair  of the Committee on Homosexual Offences and Prostitution, which in 1957 published the Wolfenden Report that recommended the decriminalisation of homosexuality.
 Hector Munro Chadwick, English philologist and historian, fellow of Clare College, Cambridge and professor of Anglo-Saxon at the University of Cambridge (1912–41)
 John Hopkins, Cambridge University academic
 Roger Clifford Carrington, English classical scholar, archaeologist and teacher (1906-1971)
 Anand Menon, European Politics and Foreign Affairs, King's College London

Arts
Art
 Thomas Hartley Cromek, English artist (1809-1873)

Literature
 Richard Bentley, theologian, classical scholar and critic (1662–1742)
 David Storey, playwright and novelist, winner of the Booker Prize in 1976 for Saville.
 Thomas Armstrong, novelist (1899 – 1978)
 Robert Munford III, American playwright (1737-1783)
 Dusty Hughes, English playwright and director

Music
 Andrew Cocup, aka Andy Cato from the band Groove Armada.
 Noel Gay, composer of popular music
 Kenneth Leighton, classical and Anglican church music composer.
 John Scott, choirmaster and organist.
 Lukas Wooller, keyboardist with the band Maxïmo Park.

Miscellaneous
 George Allan, English antiquary and lawyer. Co-writer of History and Antiquities of the Country Palatine of Durham.
 Edmund Cartwright, Inventor of the Power Loom (1743–1823).".
 Stephen Griffiths, a serial killer, from Dewsbury, known as the "Crossbow Cannibal".
 John George Haigh, serial killer in England in the 1940s, known as the "Acid Bath Murderer"
 David Hepworth, journalist and magazine publisher
 Joseph Hirst Lupton, English schoolmaster, cleric and writer (1836–1905)
 Christopher Saxton, English cartographer (c.1540-c.1610)
 Francis Smith, Puisne judge (1847–1912)
 Sidney Hayward, British barrister and legal writer
 Charles Hoole, English cleric and educational writer (1610–1667)
 Thomas Zouch, clergyman and antiquary (1737–1815)
 Sir Frank Standish, 3rd Baronet (1746-1812)
 William Alfred Ismay, librarian, writer and collector (1910-2001)

Politics
 Jonathan Baume, trade unionist
 Tony Greaves Liberal Democrat member of the House of Lords
 William J. Howard, American-born politician and Free Trade activist
 Richard Henry Lee, signer of the United States Declaration of Independence and US Senator
 Sir Francis Molyneux, 7th Baronet, Gentleman Usher of the Black Rod (1765–1812)
 Edward Thompson, Member of Parliament for York and later the Commissioner of the Admiralty
 Bertram Lamb Pearson, senior British civil servant (1893–1984)
 Frank Marshall, Baron Marshall of Leeds, British lawyer, politician, and member of the House of Lords (1915–1990)
 Henry Zouch, English antiquary and social reformer (c. 1725–1795)
 Samuel Gledhill, lieutenant-governor of Placentia, Newfoundland from 1719-c.1730

Religion
 Joseph Bingham, English scholar and divine (1668–1723)
 Hugh Paulinus de Cressy, English Benedictine monk (c.1605–1674)
 Rt Rev Jack Cunningham, inaugural Anglican Bishop of Central Zambia
 Robert Maynard Hardy, Anglican Bishop
 The Rt Revd and Rt Hon The Lord Hope of Thornes, former archbishop of York.
 John Potter, Archbishop of Canterbury (1674–1747)
 Rt Rev Arnold Lomas Wylde, Bishop of Bathurst during the mid 20th century
 Barnabas Oley, English churchman and academic (1602–1686)
 Daniel Cresswell, English divine and mathematician (1776–1844)
 John Disney, Unitarian Minister (1746–1816)
 Jeremiah Whitaker, English Puritan clergyman (1599–1654)
 John Ashton, Anglican Bishop of Grafton (1866–1964)
 Thomas Doughty, Canon of Windsor (1636-1701)
 The Ven. John Duncan, Archdeacon of Birmingham
 James Bardsley, English cleric and honorary canon of Manchester Cathedral (1805–1886)

Science and medicine
 John Radcliffe, British physician (1652–1714)
 Robert Smith, Assistant Colonial Surgeon of Sierra Leone (1840–1885)
 Andy Harter, British computer scientist
 Herbert Haslegrave, British engineer (1902–1999)
 Julian Norton, British surgeon, author and TV personality
 William Sharp, English surgeon and physician (1805–1896)

Sport
 Reg Bolton, rugby union footballer who played in the 1930s for England, Yorkshire, Wakefield and Harlequins
 William Guest, rugby union footballer who played in the 1920s and 1930s for Yorkshire, South Elmsall and Wakefield
 Mike Harrison, former captain England national rugby union team.
 Phillip Hodson, cricketer and former president of the Marylebone Cricket Club
 Alister MacKenzie, British golf course designer known for designing Augusta National Golf Club (1870–1934).
 Roger Pearman, rugby union, and rugby league footballer who played in the 1960s for Sandal, Headingley, Loughborough University, Wakefield Trinity and Canterbury-Bankstown, and coached in the 1960s for Canterbury-Bankstown
 Adam Pearson, current Hull City chairman, former commercial director of Leeds United football club and former chairman of Derby County
 Ronald Rylance, World Cup winning rugby league footballer who played in the 1940s and 1950s, for England, Yorkshire, Wakefield Trinity, Dewsbury and Huddersfield
 Mike Smith, England and Gloucestershire cricketer
 Mike Tindall, Rugby Union World Cup winning rugby union player, ex-England captain.
 Greg Wood, former England U19 cricket captain
 Ben Woods, flanker for Newcastle Falcons and England Saxons rugby union.
 Andy Forsyth, rugby union player who currently plays for Coventry R.F.C. in the RFU Championship.
 Gordon Bonner, British and Irish Lions rugby union footballer who toured New Zealand and Australia in 1930.
 Martin Dyson, English cricketer and schoolmaster who played first-class cricket for Oxford University from 1958 to 1960
Ben Morris, Rugby Union player currently playing for Wasps RFC, a product of Newcastle Falcons academy and Newcastle University RFC.
 Jonathan Lowe, cricketer

See also
Listed buildings in Wakefield

References

External links
 Queen Elizabeth Grammar School website
 The Schools Duke of Edinburghs Award Website 

Educational institutions established in the 1590s
1591 establishments in England
Private schools in the City of Wakefield
Schools in Wakefield
Member schools of the Headmasters' and Headmistresses' Conference
Schools with a royal charter
Listed buildings in Wakefield